New Zealand competed in the 1980 Summer Olympics in Moscow, USSR. In partial support of the US-led boycott, the banner of the NZOCGA was used instead of its national flag. Tay Wilson was the chef de mission. New Zealand's then largest team had been nominated with 99 competitors. However, only five New Zealand athletes competed as independents after the New Zealand government applied pressure to support the boycott.

Background
The 1980 Summer Olympics were hosted by the Soviet Union. After the host country invaded Afghanistan in December 1979, American president Jimmy Carter called for a boycott of the Moscow Games. On 8 May 1980, the New Zealand Olympic Committee and Commonwealth Games Association (NZOCGA) accepted the invitation for New Zealand to participate in the Olympic Games. The Muldoon government stepped in and threatened the NZOCGA with funding cuts and cancelled leave for competitors who were in the public service. On 29 May, the NZOCGA announced that no sponsorship or government funds would be used to fund the New Zealand team in Moscow. On 3 June, the NZOCGA announced that it would not send the New Zealand team.

Four athletes decided to go as independents: a modern pentathlete and three canoers. The decision for the canoers was based on the fact that they did not receive funding from the NZOCGA anyway so were not subject to their (or the government's) threat of funding cuts. An estimated 200 New Zealand spectators travelled to Moscow in support of the New Zealand team. By the time it became known that New Zealanders competed in two sports only those events had sold out.

Of the other athletes, 61 attended other Olympic Games but the remaining 34 missed out completely; the 34 were:

Archery
 Garry Wright

Athletics
 Karen Page
 Mike Parker
 Kim Robertson

Cycling
 Kevin Blackwell
 Eric Mackenzie
 Jack Swart

Gymnastics
 Rowena Davis

Hockey
 Pat Barwick
 Christine Berry
 Sue Emerson
 Marianne Gray
 Allana Hiha
 Karen Thomas
 Janice Neil
 Judith Phillips
 Gail Rodbourn
 Edith Weber
 Jeff Gibson

Judo
 David Clark

Rowing
 Tony Brook
 Alan Cotter
 Stephen Donaldson
 Duncan Holland
 Peter Jansen
 Robert Robinson
 Anthony Russell

Shooting
 Jack Scott
 Wayne Williams

Swimming
 Melanie Jones
 Paul Rowe

Yachting
 Rick Dodson
 Andrew Knowles
 Gerald Sly

Results by event

Canoeing

Modern pentathlon

References

External links
sports-reference

Nations at the 1980 Summer Olympics
1980 Summer Olympics
Summer Olympics